The Marriage Duty Act 1695, also known as the Registration Tax, was a 1695 Act of the Parliament of England which imposed a tax on births, marriages, burials, childless widowers, and bachelors over the age of 25. It was primarily used as a revenue raising mechanism for war on France and as a means of ensuring that proper records were kept by Anglican church officials.  The tax was found ineffective and abolished by 1706.

See also 
 Bachelor tax

References

External links 
 https://www.british-history.ac.uk/statutes-realm/vol6/pp568-583

Acts of the Parliament of England
1695 in law
Marriage, unions and partnerships in England
1695 in England
Marriage law in the United Kingdom